Susan Hagey Wall is an American former professional tennis player.

Biography
One of eight children, Hagey grew up in La Jolla, California and played college tennis for Stanford. Her sister Cari and brother Chico were also tennis players, both at Stanford and on the professional tour.

A four-time All-American, Hagey formed a successful doubles formation with Diane Morrison, winning back to back AIAW doubles championships in 1975 and 1976. She graduated in 1979 and that year represented the United States at the 1979 Pan American Games in San Juan, where she won a gold medal in both singles and doubles.

Hagey competed in the main draws at Wimbledon and the US Open during her career, most notably in the former. She was a mixed doubles quarter-finalist at the 1974 Wimbledon Championships with Raúl Ramírez, beating the Czechoslovak pairing of Jan Kodeš and Martina Navratilova en route. At the 1977 Wimbledon Championships, she qualified for the singles main draw as a lucky loser. Following a first round bye, she was beaten in the second round by JoAnne Russell.

Notes

References

External links
 
 

Year of birth missing (living people)
Living people
American female tennis players
Stanford Cardinal women's tennis players
Pan American Games gold medalists for the United States
Pan American Games medalists in tennis
Tennis players at the 1979 Pan American Games
Tennis people from California
People from La Jolla, San Diego
Medalists at the 1979 Pan American Games